Beryozovaya Roshcha is a rural locality (a village) in the Vygonichsky District, Bryansk Oblast, Russia. The population was 32 as of 2010. There is 1 street.

Geography 
Beryozovaya Roshcha is located 33 km south of Vygonichi (the district's administrative centre) by road. Desnyansky is the nearest rural locality.

References 

Rural localities in Vygonichsky District